The 2013–14 FC Porto season in domestic and international football competitions.

Legend

Pre-season and friendlies

Competitions

Overview

Supertaça Cândido de Oliveira

Primeira Liga

League table

Matches

Taça de Portugal

Taça da Liga

Third round

Knockout phase

UEFA Champions League

Group stage

UEFA Europa League

Knockout phase

Round of 32

Round of 16

Quarter-finals

Squad

Current squad

Transfers

In

Out

References

FC Porto seasons
Porto
Porto